Óscar Rico Lomas (born 5 December 1985) is a Spanish footballer who plays for CF Intercity as a left winger.

He played 35 Segunda División matches, for Tenerife, Jaén and Llagostera, but spent most of his career in Segunda División B in representation of 11 clubs, playing 364 games and scoring 44 goals.

Football career
Born in Elche, Province of Alicante, Valencian Community, Rico began his professional career at neighbouring Levante UD, making his senior debut with the reserves in the 2002–03 season, in Tercera División. He first arrived in Segunda División B in 2005, signing for UD Almansa.

Rico spent the following seven years competing in the third level, representing Levante B, FC Cartagena (two stints), Lorca Deportiva CF, Cultural y Deportiva Leonesa, Deportivo Alavés and Orihuela CF. In the 2012–13 campaign he was an important midfield unit for the second club, participating in 22 of the 46 goals scored by the club, assisting in 18 and scoring four himself.

On 28 June 2013, Rico signed with CD Tenerife, freshly promoted to Segunda División. He played his first professional match on 18 August, starting in a 0–1 away loss against AD Alcorcón.

On 21 January 2014, Rico moved to Real Jaén also from division two. After the Andalusian team's relegation he joined UE Llagostera, recently promoted to the second tier.

Rico terminated his contract with the Catalans on 30 January 2015, joining CF Reus Deportiu hours later. In June 2016, after the club's promotion to the second tier, he remained in the third and signed for Cartagena again. He rescinded his contract the following 31 January, to sign for Mérida AD the next day for the rest of the season.

In July 2017, Rico signed for Atlético Baleares. At the start of the new year, he joined FC Jumilla. Following their relegation to the fourth tier, he joined CF Intercity of his native region at that level in July 2019.

References

External links

1985 births
Living people
Footballers from Elche
Spanish footballers
Association football wingers
Segunda División players
Segunda División B players
Tercera División players
Atlético Levante UD players
CD Logroñés footballers
FC Cartagena footballers
Lorca Deportiva CF footballers
Cultural Leonesa footballers
Deportivo Alavés players
Orihuela CF players
CD Tenerife players
UE Costa Brava players
CF Reus Deportiu players
Mérida AD players
CD Atlético Baleares footballers
FC Jumilla players
CF Intercity players